Raja Aur Rancho is a detective series which aired in India on DD Metro in 1997–1998. The show is about a detective named Raja (Ved Thapar) and his pet monkey Rancho.  Every week, this duo solve a new crime. Famous TV Actor Mohan Bhandari played the role of Raja in initial episodes.

Cast 
 Ved Thapar as Raja
 Rancho (monkey) as Rancho
 Sameer Dharmadhikari as Episodic in some episodes
 Murali Sharma as Episodic in some episodes

References 

DD Metro original programming
1990s Indian television series
DD National original programming
Detective television series